Oupoh Maxime Nagoli  (born 20 December 2000) is an Ivorian footballer who plays as a goalkeeper for SOL FC.

References

Living people
2000 births
Ivorian footballers
Footballers at the 2020 Summer Olympics
Olympic footballers of Ivory Coast
Association football goalkeepers